The "Michele Pittaluga" International Classical Guitar Competition is an annual music competition for classical guitarists held in Alessandria, Italy. It was founded in 1968 and has earned an international reputation, entering membership of the World Federation of International Music Competitions - Geneve in 1981, ISPA (International Society for the Performing Arts) - New York in 2010 and UNESCO. It is the oldest active international classical guitar competition in Italy and one of the oldest in the world.

Founders
The competition was started in 1968 by musicologist Dr. Michele Pittaluga  (b. Jan 1915 - d. June 1995) as the "City of Alessandria Prize", to mark the 800th anniversary of the city. It gained early support from Andrés Segovia, who was the first Honorary President. Acting on his suggestion, Alirio Díaz was called to preside over the Jury for the first 30 editions, then acting as Artistic Director until the 40th edition, which is now overseen by Marco Diaz Tamayo. Alirio Díaz remained the Honorary President of the competition until his death in 2016.

History
In the beginning, the competition was dedicated to solo guitar. For the first years, i.e. from the 7th to 11th edition, the performance was accompanied by the orchestra indeed, but the concerto was only partially performed. The competition winner would perform it in its entirety during the final awards ceremony. From the 12th edition, the final performance was accompanied by piano and only the competition winner performed the concerto with the orchestra during the awards ceremony. Occasionally, the performance with orchestra was substituted by a string quartet. The finals have involved orchestral or chamber music since 1974. Since 1981, in response to the directives of the WFIMC, the program of the Competition has been extended to repertoires with orchestra or string quartet.

The competition was made up of two rounds i.e. Qualifying Round and Final Round, from the year of establishment to 1996. Since the 30th edition, the competition has been made up of three rounds: Preliminary Round, Semi-Final Round, and Final Round.

After the death of Dr. Michele Pittaluga, in June 1995, the name of the competition was changed to "Michele Pittaluga International Guitar Competition - Premio Citta di Alessandria" and now organized by the Organising Committee of the Classical Guitar Competition "Michele Pittaluga" (Comitato Promotore del Concorso di Chitarra Classica "Michele Pittaluga") that has, as part of its constitution, the commitment to spreading the knowledge of the guitar repertoire, promoting new talents and supporting initiatives in favor of these goals. His three children, Maria Luisa, Micaela, and Marcello Pittaluga have been running the competition ever since. Micaela Pittaluga became the Head of Organising Committee, President of the Competition, and Marcello became the permanent Secretary of the Jury. Also, the same year Competition has been placed under the High Patronage of the President of the Republic of Italy and under the Patronage of UNESCO Italian Commission.

The value of the first prize has risen over the years from Italian Lire 500000 to Euro 10000. Naxos Records contract and a concert tour became repetitive parts of the award. The Golden Medal of the Presidency of the Italian Republic awarded since 1997.

Correlated events
In 1997 a separate competition was created, entitled International Composition Competition for Classical Guitar "Michele Pittaluga" with the idea of expanding the contemporary guitar repertoire.

In 2014 the International Junior Talents Competition "Pittaluga Junior" was founded.

International Classical Guitar Competition "Michele Pittaluga - Premio Città di Alessandria"

Rules
 The International Jury consisting of at least seven members of different nationalities with an established reputation in the music world.
 Representatives of the Italian Ministry of Culture (MBC), the Italian Ministry of the Education, University, Research (MIUR) and those of the WFIMC of Geneva will be allowed to assist the Jury without taking part in the voting.
 The first prize cannot be shared. In special cases, the International Jury may award remaining prizes equally.
 The competition consist of three rounds, each of them are public.
 The final round played with orchestra or string quartet.
 All composition are performed from memory.
 Soloists of all nationalities are admitted to enter the competition, provided that they are less than 33 years old.
 1st Prize winners of the past editions are not permitted to participate.

Winners
Source Official webpage

Jury
Source Official website

International Composition Competition for Classical Guitar "Michele Pittaluga"

Rules
 The International Jury consisting of at least five members of different nationalities with an established reputation in the music world.
 The first prize cannot be shared. In special cases, the International Jury may award remaining prizes equally.
 Each author shall be responsible for verifying the actual performability of the piece.
 Compositions entered for the contest must be unpublished and must never before have been performed in public.
 Composers of all nationalities and any age who have not won first prize in any of the previous editions are admitted to enter the competition.

Winners

Jury

International Junior Talents Competition "Pittaluga Junior"

Rules
 The International Jury consisting of at least five members of different nationalities with an established reputation in the music world.
 Only the first prize is awarded.
 The competition consist of single round, opened to the public.
 All composition are performed from memory.
 Soloists of all nationalities are admitted to enter the competition, provided that they are less than 17 years old.
 1st Prize winners of the past editions are not permitted to participate.

Winners, Jury and editions

See also

 International classical guitar competitions
 List of classical music competitions
 Classical guitar

External links
  in English
 Official Facebook page
 Official Youtube channel

References

Classical music awards
Music competitions in Italy
Guitar competitions
Classical guitar
1968 establishments in Italy
Awards established in 1968
Alessandria